Lake End is an unincorporated community in the southern part of Red River Parish, Louisiana, United States. It is located off Interstate 49 (exit 155) near the intersection of Louisiana Highway 1 and Louisiana Highway 174.

References 

Populated places in Ark-La-Tex
Unincorporated communities in Louisiana
Unincorporated communities in Red River Parish, Louisiana